Theodosios Balafas (27 August 1923 – 6 April 2015) was a Greek pole vaulter who competed in the 1948 Summer Olympics and in the 1952 Summer Olympics.

References

1923 births
2015 deaths
Greek male pole vaulters
Olympic athletes of Greece
Athletes (track and field) at the 1948 Summer Olympics
Athletes (track and field) at the 1952 Summer Olympics
Mediterranean Games bronze medalists for Greece
Mediterranean Games medalists in athletics
Athletes (track and field) at the 1951 Mediterranean Games
20th-century Greek people
21st-century Greek people